MonteZOOMa: The Forbidden Fortress, previously known as Montezooma’s Revenge, is a shuttle roller coaster located at Knott's Berry Farm in Buena Park, California, United States. Designed by Anton Schwarzkopf, the ride opened on May 21, 1978, and is one of eight flywheel-launched units manufactured for theme parks around the world. It is the oldest shuttle loop roller coaster still in its original location and the last coaster of its kind in the United States. 

Unlike traditional looping coasters, MonteZOOMa: The Forbidden Fortress uses conventional lap bar restraints to secure riders instead of over-the-shoulder restraints. The ride was closed in February 2022 for a major refurbishment and is scheduled to reopen in 2023.

History

Montezooma's Revenge was named after the bluegrass group, Montezuma's Revenge, a musical act that performed regularly in the wagon camp at Knott's Berry Farm. Based on the launch mechanism for aircraft carriers, the flywheel-launched shuttle loop is a successor of the drop-tower launch shuttle, and predates modern LIM and hydraulic launch systems by over 15 years. The drop tower models had a large silo with a weight inside connected to a similar launch system. The weight would drop, thus pulling the cable and bob, launching the train. Drawbacks included no adjustments for inclement weather. Also, the drop-tower launch was nowhere as intense as the flywheel launch, taking almost two seconds longer to reach the same speed.

The nearby Jaguar! roller coaster, which opened in 1995, passes directly through the center of Montezooma's loop. In 2002, Montezooma's Revenge was repainted in a teal and yellow color scheme. In 2008, Knott's opened Pony Express, a small "out and back" steel roller coaster with a flywheel launch system much like Montezooma's Revenge.

In 2017, Montezooma's Revenge was painted with orange track and dark green supports. The ride is closed for a major refurbishment throughout the 2022 season, set to reopen in 2023.

Launch mechanism and safety features

The train goes through a vertical loop, then ascends a spike and reverses direction. It passes through the station in reverse and ascends another spike behind the station. The  flywheel, located outside the station and adjacent to the loop, is attached to a clutch and cable system, which in turn connects to a small four-wheeled catch car known as a "bob". On the front of the bob is a launch pin that seats in a socket in the back of the train. Once the bob is seated, the operators receive the ready light.

At launch, the clutch system engages the cable to the spinning flywheel, pulling the bob and train rapidly forwards. During the launch sequence, enough kinetic energy is removed from the flywheel to reduce its speed from approximately 1044 rpm to 872 rpm. The train negotiates a  diameter vertical loop before ascending the  front spike, then descends backwards, going through the loop a second time, running at full speed backwards through the station, and ascending the  rear spike. It is at this point where the best "airtime" on the ride is experienced. The train then returns to its starting position after being slowed by 66 sets of brakes, 33 in the station and 33 to the rear of the station.

Following Cedar Fair's 1997 acquisition of Knott's Berry Farm, fabric seat belts were added as a secondary restraint to complement the existing lap bar restraints.

Incidents

Justine Dedele Bolia, a 20-year-old female tourist from the Republic of Congo, died on September 1, 2001, one day after riding Montezooma's Revenge. Bolia suffered a ruptured middle cerebral artery and an autopsy revealed a pre-existing condition. The ride was closed for several days while an investigation was conducted. Though state investigators concluded that the ride did not contribute to her death, a wrongful death lawsuit was later filed by her family in 2002. The lawsuit was dismissed in 2006.

Awards and rankings
On June 20, 2019, Montezooma's Revenge was designated as a Roller Coaster Landmark by the American Coaster Enthusiasts, officially recognizing the ride as the last coaster of its kind in the United States and the longest standing in its original location. There is a plaque commemorating the achievement. Knott's tweeted their announcement of the award.

References

External links
Official Montezooma's Revenge page

Knott's Berry Farm
Roller coasters introduced in 1978
Roller coasters operated by Cedar Fair
Roller coasters in California